Timur D'Vatz (born 16 April 1968 in Moscow, Russia) is a figurative painter.

He began his education at the Republic College of Art (Uzbekistan) and London's Royal Academy of Arts in 1996. He has won several awards including the Guinness prize for First Time Exhibitor at the Royal Academy of Arts Summer Exhibition, 1994; the A.T Kearney prize, 1996; and the B.P Portrait award at London's National Portrait Gallery, 2002. His parents were both also artists.

References

External links
 
 Artwork by Timur D'Vatz

1968 births
21st-century Russian painters
Living people
20th-century Russian painters
Russian male painters
20th-century Russian male artists
21st-century Russian male artists